Zalantun (Manchu  or ) or Zhalantun (Mongolian:  Жалан-Айл хот), is a city with an estimated population of 132,408 and administrative division of Hulunbuir Prefecture-level city, Inner Mongolia, China. It is in the northeastern part of Inner Mongolia, in the southeastern foothills of the Greater Khingan mountains, bordering Heilongjiang province to the east. It is an area which has a number of forests and streams, as well as the Yalu River, not to be confused with the Yalu River on the Sino-Korean border. It is known for its hunting and fishing.

History

Zalantun was formerly known as Butha, and the city was made into an administrative centre in the Kangxi era. In 1929, Buteha was renamed as Yalu county because the Yalu River runs through it, but in 1933 it became the Zalantun Banner. In 1983, Zalantun ceased to be a banner and became a part of Hulunbuir, remaining so today.

Climate 
Zalantun has a monsoon-influenced humid continental climate (Köppen Dwa/Dwb), with long frigid winters, very warm summers, and short transitional seasons. Typifying the influence of the East Asian Monsoon, on average, a majority of the annual  of precipitation falls in July and August alone.

Economy
Zalantun's economy is based primarily on tourism and agriculture, livestock and forestry. The Harbin-Manzhouli Railway traverses the district. It is rich in food grains, particularly wheat, soy and corn, as well as cattle, sheep, horse and other livestock. It has an industrial base in paper production, candy production, and wool. It has an annual average temperature of 2 °C and an average annual precipitation of 480mm. The northwest portion of the district consists of natural forests in the Greater Khingan mountains.

Transport
Zhalantun Chengjisihan Airport was opened in December 2016.

References

Cities in Inner Mongolia
Hulunbuir
County-level divisions of Inner Mongolia